Patriarch Vikentije may refer to:

Serbian Patriarch Vikentije I, Archbishop of Peć and Serbian Patriarch (1758)
Serbian Patriarch Vikentije II, Archbishop of Peć and Serbian Patriarch (1950–1958)